Edmond Alphandéry (born 2 September 1943) is a French politician, public-sector company executive, and public policy advocate. He was the French Minister of Economy and Finance from 1993 to 1995, executive chairman of Électricité de France from 1995 to 1998, and chairman of CNP Assurances from 1998 to 2012. In 1999 he founded the Euro 50 Group, of which he is chairman as of early 2021.

Education and early employment
 Institut d'Études Politiques de Paris   – Fulbright Fellowship (1967–1968)
 University of Chicago   – Associate of Political Economy/Doctorate in Economics
 Professor of Economics at Panthéon-Assas University

Training, employment and political career
 Deputy UDF for Maine-et-Loire from 1978 to 1993
 General Council Member for the District of Longué-Jumelles (Maine-et-Loire) from 1976 to March 2008.
 President of the General Council of Maine-et-Loire (1994–1995)
 Mayor of Longué-Jumelles from 1977 to March 2008.
 Minister of Economy from 1993 to 1995 under Prime Minister Édouard Balladur.

Minister of Economy and Finance
 He was Minister of Economy from 1993 to 1995 during the government of Édouard Balladur. Some of his most notable actions as Minister are:
 Act of 19 July 1993: privatization program (Credit Local de France, Rhone-Poulenc, Banque Nationale de Paris, Elf-Aquitaine, Union des Assurances de Paris, Seita)
 Increased state participation in the capital of Renault
 Restructuring of public enterprises in financial review (Air France, Credit Lyonnais). He said that the mounting rescue Credit Lyonnais would be "painless for the taxpayers," while according to an estimate of the Court of Auditors in 1999, the loss would be 14.8 billion euros
 Change in the status of the Banque de France (Act of 4 August 1993)
 Stimulating household consumption (premium States for the purchase of new motor vehicles)
 Entering into final negotiations of the Uruguay Round
 Convincing member states of the franc zone to accept a substantial devaluation of the CFA franc
 Publication of the Consumer Code.

Later positions
 President of Électricité de France (EDF Energy) from 1995 to 1998
 Director of the think-tank Friends of Europe
 Member of the Trilateral Commission
 Chairman of the Board of Directors of CNP Assurances and CNP International.
 Chairman of the Centre des Professions Financières
 Director of Engie, Calyon, Icade of Caixa Seguros (Brazil), CNP Capitalia Vita (Italy), the media company Parisian Posters of * GT Finance
 Member of the European Advisory Board to Nomura Securities
 President of Centre for European Policy Studies
 Founding chairman of Euro 50 Group since 1998

References

|-

1943 births
Living people
Politicians from Avignon
Centre of Social Democrats politicians
Union for French Democracy politicians
French Ministers of Finance
Deputies of the 6th National Assembly of the French Fifth Republic
Deputies of the 7th National Assembly of the French Fifth Republic
Deputies of the 8th National Assembly of the French Fifth Republic
Deputies of the 9th National Assembly of the French Fifth Republic
Deputies of the 10th National Assembly of the French Fifth Republic
Électricité de France people
Sciences Po alumni
Academic staff of Paris 2 Panthéon-Assas University